Fones may refer to:

Fones (surname)
Fones House, a historic house in Little Rock, Arkansas, U.S.
HearFones, an acoustic, non-electronic instrument